The Hutt City Council is a territorial authority in New Zealand, governing the city of Lower Hutt. Lower Hutt is the country's seventh largest city. The city borders Porirua to the north, Upper Hutt to the northeast, South Wairarapa District to the east, and Wellington to the southwest and west. It is one of nine territorial authorities in the Wellington Region.

Council and committees
The Mayor and all Councillors are members of the Council.

Mayor

One mayor is elected at large from the electors of Lower Hutt.

Harbour Ward
Harbour Ward returns one councillor to the Hutt City Council.

Central Ward
Central Ward returns one councillor to the Hutt City Council.

Western Ward
Western Ward returns one councillor to the Hutt City Council.

Northern Ward
Northern Ward returns one councillor to the Hutt City Council.

Eastern Ward
Eastern Ward returns one councillor to the Hutt City Council.

Wainuiomata Ward
Wainuiomata Ward returns one councillor to the Hutt City Council.

At-large Ward
The remaining six councillors are elected at-large from the electors of Lower Hutt.

Community boards
The Council has created three local community boards under the provisions of Part 4 of the Local Government Act 2002, with members elected using a first-past-the-post (FPP) system or appointed by the Council. The community boards are as follows:
 Eastbourne Community Board;
 Petone Community Board;
 Wainuiomata Community Board.

See also
Hutt Valley

References

External links
Hutt City Council website

 
City councils in New Zealand